Tortella may refer to:
 Tortellà, a village in the province of Girona and autonomous community of Catalonia, Spain.
 Tortella (plant), a moss genus in the family Pottiaceae.